Kadir Çermik (born 21 July 1977) is a Turkish stage, film, television, and voice actor.

Çermik is a graduate of Eskişehir Anadolu University State Conservatory. He made his television debut in 1999 with a role in the series Yılan Hikayesi. In the following years he worked mostly as a voice actor. His cinematic breakthrough occurred in 2008 with his role in the movie Made in Europe, for which he received the Best Actor award at the 15th International Adana Film Festival. He continued his career by appearing in supporting roles in series such as Muhteşem Yüzyıl, Karadayı, and Bana Sevmeyi Anlat. His performance in the 2015 movie Sarmaşık earned him critical acclaim and various awards. Between 2017 and 2021, he starred as a regular in the TV series Çukur.

Filmography

Television 
 2022 – Bir Peri Masalı (Samet)
 2021–2022 – Üç Kuruş (Baybars)
 2017–2021 – Çukur (Emmi / Mucahit)
 2016 – Bana Sevmeyi Anlat (Salih)
 2015 – Kırgın Çiçekler (Necmi)
 2012–2013 – Karadayı (Geveze Ahmet)
 2011 – Muhteşem Yüzyıl (Louis II of Hungary)
 2001–2004 – Kuzenlerim (Oğuz)
 2001 – Yeditepe İstanbul
 2001 – Yılan Hikayesi (Jandarma Cavit)

Film 
 2023 – 10 Days of a Good Man
 2018 – Ahlat Ağacı (Adnan)
 2017 – Put Şeylere
 2017 – Murtaza (Zeynel)
 2017 – Kırık Kalpler Bankası (Sabit)
 2017 – Kaygı (Baba)
 2014 – Sarmaşık (Usta Gemici İsmail)
 2012 – Gözetleme Kulesi (Şoför)
 2009 – Bornova Bornova (Salih)
 2007 – Made in Europe

Awards 
2008 – 15th International Adana Film Festival – Best Actor (Made in Europe)
21st Sadri Alışık Theatre and Cinema Awards – Most Successful Actor in a Supporting Role (Drama) (Sarmaşık)
2016 – 27th Ankara Film Festival – Best Supporting Actor (Sarmaşık)

References

External links 
 
 

1977 births
Turkish male film actors
Turkish male voice actors
Turkish male stage actors
Turkish male television actors
Living people
Anadolu University alumni
People from Van, Turkey